İsmail Konuk is a Turkish professional footballer who plays as a defender for Tuzlaspor. He came through from the Denizlispor youth academy, and made his professional debut in 2006.

References

External links

1988 births
Living people
Turkish footballers
Denizlispor footballers
İstanbulspor footballers
Akhisarspor footballers
Bursaspor footballers
Süper Lig players
TFF First League players
Sportspeople from Denizli
Association football defenders
Gaziantep F.K. footballers
Adana Demirspor footballers